Rokosjøen is a lake in Løten Municipality (and a very small part crossing into Elverum Municipality) in Innlandet county, Norway. There is a camping facility on the east end of the lake. Oset Chapel is located beside the campground facility.

 
The Rokoberget church ruins stand on a ridge south of the lake Rokosjøen. Rokoberget Church was dedicated to Saint Michael and mentioned in a papal letter from 1254. It is believed that the church was not used after the Protestant Reformation. The ruin was excavated in 1906–1907. The ruin is fenced with an information board outside the fence.

See also
List of lakes in Norway

References

Elverum
Løten
Lakes of Innlandet